Robert Campbell (born March 31, 1937 in Buffalo, New York) is a writer and architect. He is currently an architecture critic for the Boston Globe. He lives and works in Cambridge, Massachusetts.

Education

Campbell is a graduate of Harvard College, where he graduated Phi Beta Kappa, the Columbia Graduate School of Journalism, and the Harvard Graduate School of Design, where he received the Appleton Traveling Fellowship and Francis Kelley Prize.

Career

Architect and critic

Campbell entered private practice as an architect in 1975, as a consultant for the improvement or expansion of cultural institutions, including the Isabella Stewart Gardner Museum and the Boston Symphony Orchestra. He has been an urban design consultant to cities and is an advisor to the Mayors' Institute on City Design, which he helped found.

In 1997 he was architect-in-residence at the American Academy in Rome. In 2002 he helped plan and appeared in a television series, “Beyond the Big Dig”.

Poet and photographer

Campbell's poems have appeared in the Atlantic Monthly and Harvard Review, among other publications. His photographs have also been published widely.

Teaching

Campbell has taught at the Harvard Graduate School of Design, the Boston Architectural College, and the University of North Carolina. He also is a former visiting scholar at the Massachusetts Institute of Technology. From 1993 to 2002 he was visiting Sam Gibbons Eminent Scholar in Architecture and Urban Planning at the University of South Florida, and in 2002 he was Max Fisher Visiting Professor at the University of Michigan. In 2003 he was a senior fellow in the National Arts Journalism Program at Columbia University.

Awards

In 1996, Campbell won the Pulitzer Prize for Criticism. A Fellow of the American Institute of Architects, he has received the AIA's Medal for Criticism; the Commonwealth Award of the Boston Society of Architects; a Design Fellowship from the National Endowment for the Arts (1976); and grants from the Graham Foundation and the J. M. Kaplan Fund. Mr. Campbell was the 2004 recipient of the Award of Honor from the Boston Society of Architects. In 2002 he won a national Columbia Dupont Award for "Beyond the Big Dig". He is a Fellow of the American Academy of Arts and Sciences. Campbell is also a senior fellow of the Design Futures Council. Campbell was one of two architecture critics to be honored with the 2018 Vincent Scully Prize, awarded by the National Building Museum; his fellow honoree was Inga Saffron, who is architecture critic of The Philadelphia Inquirer.

Partial bibliography
1992: (with Peter Vanderwarker) 
2002: (with Curtis W. Fentress, et al.)

External links
Partial Campbell bibliography
Mayors' Institute on City Design

References

American architecture critics
New Classical architects
American male non-fiction writers
The Boston Globe people
Pulitzer Prize for Criticism winners
Harvard College alumni
Columbia University Graduate School of Journalism alumni
Living people
1937 births
University of Michigan faculty
Harvard Graduate School of Design alumni
Fellows of the American Academy of Arts and Sciences